Evan Alan MacLane (born November 4, 1982) is an American professional baseball pitcher who is currently a free agent. He played in Major League Baseball (MLB) for the St. Louis Cardinals and in Nippon Professional Baseball (NPB) for the Orix Buffaloes.

Career
MacLane attended Pleasant Valley High School in Chico and went on to Feather River College.

MacLane was taken as the 739th pick (25th round) of the 2003 Major League Baseball Draft by the New York Mets. MacLane signed with the Mets and played in their minor-league system until 2006, rising to the Triple-A level.

In 2006, MacLane was traded from the Mets to the Arizona Diamondbacks for Shawn Green. He pitched in the Diamondbacks system until 2009, all in Triple-A. In 2009, he signed with the St. Louis Cardinals as a minor league free agent, and joined the Cardinals' Triple-A franchise, the Memphis Redbirds.

On May 29, 2010, MacLane was promoted to the big leagues with the St. Louis Cardinals and assigned to the bullpen. He was returned to Memphis two days later, without appearing in a major league game.

MacLane was called back up on June 7, 2010. On July 7, 2010, he made his major league debut and allowed a ninth-inning walk-off home run to Chris Iannetta at Coors Field.

On January 2, 2011, he signed with the Orix Buffaloes in Japan. In 2 seasons with Orix, MacLane went 8-7 with a 4.09 ERA over 25 appearances (20 starts), striking out 50 in 99 innings.

MacLane has pitched ten seasons in the Dominican Professional Baseball League, where he continued to be one of this winter league's more effective starters in 2017-2018.

On June 13, 2018, MacLane signed with the Tecolotes de los Dos Laredos of the Mexican League. He was released on July 18, 2018.

References

External links
, or NPB, or CPBL
MacLane player profile page at Scout.com
Venezuelan Professional Baseball League statistics

]

1982 births
Living people
American expatriate baseball players in Japan
American expatriate baseball players in Mexico
American expatriate baseball players in Taiwan
Baseball players from California
Sportspeople from Chico, California
Binghamton Mets players
Bravos de Margarita players
Brooklyn Cyclones players
Capital City Bombers players
EDA Rhinos players
Estrellas Orientales players
American expatriate baseball players in the Dominican Republic
Feather River Golden Eagles baseball players
Kingsport Mets players
Major League Baseball pitchers
Memphis Redbirds players
Mexican League baseball pitchers
Navegantes del Magallanes players
American expatriate baseball players in Venezuela
Nippon Professional Baseball pitchers
Norfolk Tides players
Orix Buffaloes players
Reno Aces players
St. Lucie Mets players
Tecolotes de los Dos Laredos players
Tucson Sidewinders players